Dobrzyca Leśna  is a village in the administrative district of Gmina Wałcz, within Wałcz County, West Pomeranian Voivodeship, in North-Western Poland.

References

Villages in Wałcz County